John Emmett Lyle Jr. (September 4, 1910 – November 11, 2003) was a U.S. Representative from Texas.

Early life
A third generation Texan born in Boyd, Texas, Lyle graduated from Wichita Falls High School, Wichita Falls, Texas.
He attended the Junior College at Wichita Falls, the University of Texas (working as a night watchman in the Capitol basement), and the Houston Law School at night.  He was admitted to the bar in 1934, and entered private practice in Corpus Christi.

Political career
Lyle served as member of the Texas House of Representatives from 1941 to 1944.
He was in the United States Army from 1942 to 1944.  When he won the Democratic primary 22 July 1942, he was an active duty Captain of artillery in Italy.

Lyle was elected as a Democrat to the Seventy-ninth and to the four succeeding Congresses (January 3, 1945 – January 3, 1955).  He enjoyed strong support from the Parr family of Duval County.  He was not a candidate for renomination in 1954 to the Eighty-fourth Congress.

He was appointed to the Federal Council on Aging, 1994.

He was a director of Falcon Seabord and St. Luke's Hospital.

He died on November 11, 2003, in Houston, Texas.  He was interred in Texas State Cemetery, Austin, Texas.

Sources

External links 

1910 births
2003 deaths
University of Texas at Austin alumni
Texas lawyers
Democratic Party members of the Texas House of Representatives
Burials at Texas State Cemetery
United States Army officers
United States Army personnel of World War II
People from Boyd, Texas
Democratic Party members of the United States House of Representatives from Texas
20th-century American politicians
20th-century American lawyers
Military personnel from Texas